Double Dealer is a Japanese hard rock/heavy metal band.

Double Dealer may also refer to:
Double Dealer (film), Australian film 1975
Doubledealer (Transformers), a character from the Transformers series
The Double Dealer, a 1694 play by William Congreve
The Double Dealer (magazine), a 1920s literary magazine
"Double Dealers", an episode of Onedin Line
The Double Dealer, a short story by David Liss in Thriller

See also
 Cheating at poker
"Lady Double Dealer", a song by Deep Purple from Stormbringer
"Lady Double Dealer", a song by Krokus from Metal Rendez-vous
Double dealing (disambiguation)